Julien Moineau (Clichy, 27 November 1903 — La Teste, 14 March 1980) was a French professional road bicycle racer, who won three stages in the Tour de France. Julien Moineau was the father of cyclist Alain Moineau.

Major results

1927
Circuit de Bourgogne
Paris-Le Havre
Tour de France:
8th place overall classification
GP Wolber
1928
Tour de France:
winner stage 14
1929
Circuit de la Mayenne
Tour de France:
winner stage 8
1930
Circuit du Forez
Paris-Limoges
1932
Paris-Limoges
Paris–Tours
1933
Paris-Limoges
1935
Tour de France:
winner stage 17

External links 

Official Tour de France results for Julien Moineau

French male cyclists
French Tour de France stage winners
1903 births
1980 deaths
Sportspeople from Clichy, Hauts-de-Seine
Cyclists from Île-de-France